The President Range is a mountain range of the Canadian Rockies, located in the northwestern section of Yoho National Park. The range is named for the highest peak in the range, The President.

This range includes the following mountains and peaks:

References

Ranges of the Canadian Rockies
Mountain ranges of British Columbia